Aljazayer (also Romanized as Aljazāyer and Al Jazāyer; also known as ‘Abd or Raḩīm-e Ẕomdī) is a village in Seyyed Abbas Rural District, Shavur District, Shush County, Khuzestan Province, Iran. At the 2006 census, its population was 1,696, in 232 families.

References 

Populated places in Shush County